Duke Charles may refer to:
Charles IX of Sweden
Charles XIII of Sweden
Charles, Duke of Burgundy